Sidi M'Hamed Ben Ali District is a district of Relizane Province, Algeria.

Districts of Relizane Province